Henry Scougal (1650–1678) was a Scottish theologian, minister and author.

Henry Scougal was the second son of Patrick Scougal and Margaret Wemys. His father was Bishop of Aberdeen for more than 20 years. Henry's younger brother was James Scougal, Lord Whitehill.

From his infancy, Scougal was raised with religion. From his youth, Scougal spent his free hours in reading, meditation and prayer. He especially enjoyed studying the historical passages of the Old Testament.

In 1665 Scougal entered King's College, University of Aberdeen, and, after graduation, was promoted to the office of professor of philosophy. In 1672, Scougal was ordained and appointed minister of a church 20 miles from Aberdeen, where he served for one year before returning to take the office of professor of divinity at King's College, where he taught for five years. He spoke Latin, Hebrew, and a few Asian languages.

Scougal produced a number of works while a pastor and professor of divinity at King's. His most recognized work, The Life of God in the Soul of Man, was originally written to a friend to explain Christianity and give spiritual counsel. This work was almost universally praised by the leaders of the Great Awakening, including George Whitefield, who said he never really understood what true religion was until he had digested Scougal's treatise.

On 13 June 1678 Scougal died of tuberculosis.

Works
De  Objecto Cultus  Religiosi  (Aberdeen,  1674)
The Life  of  God  in  the  Soul  of  Man  (London, 1677)  edited  by  [Bishop]  Gilbert  Burnet, 1691,  1707,  1742,  1751,  1753,  other  editions, and  a  French  translation  in  1727
also edition  (with  portrait  and  Life)  by  James Cooper,  D.D.,  Aberdeen,  1892)
Reflections and  Meditations  (Aberdeen,  1740)
Essays, Moral  and  Divine  (Aberdeen,  1740)
Sermons  (Glasgow,  1751)
Sermons  (Aberdeen, 1773)
He  is  said  to  have  left  in manuscript  three  Latin  tractates  —  "A Short  System  of  Ethics,"  "  A  Preservative against  the  Artifices  of  Roman  Missionaries," and  the  first  chapter  of  "The Pastoral  Care,"  but  these  were  not  printed, and  the  MSS.  have  disappeared.

Bibliography
Reg. of  Deeds,  Durie,  cvii.,  28th  Dec.  1705 ; 
Butler's  Henry  Scougal  and  the  Oxford Methodists  (Edinburgh,  1899)
Orem's Hist,  of  Aberdeen,  178
Works  (Aberdeen, 1759,  1765,  1773;  London,  1818;  Glasgow, 1830).

References

Citations

Sources

External links
 
 
 

Scottish Christian theologians
Alumni of the University of Aberdeen
17th-century deaths from tuberculosis
1650 births
1678 deaths
Tuberculosis deaths in Scotland